Local governments in the Han dynasty (202 BC – 220 AD) consisted of three levels of administrative divisions: provinces (cishibu 刺史部, or zhou), commanderies (jun) and counties (xian). The early Han dynasty inherited a two-tiered system of government composed of commanderies and counties from the Warring States (5th century BC – 221 BC) and the Qin dynasty  (221 BC – 206 BC), while 13 provinces were created on top of the existing hierarchy in 106 BC.

In each province, the central government assigned an Inspector (cishi, 刺史) to audit the administration of commanderies and kingdoms, from 106 BC to 1 BC and from 42 AD to 188 AD. In other periods, the position was replaced by a Governor (mu, 牧, literally "shepherd"), a higher-ranked official. A commandery was under a Commandery Administrator (junshou, 郡守, before 148 BC) or a Grand Administrator (taishou, 太守, after 148 BC). A county was governed by a Magistrate (ling, 令, for larger counties) or a Chief (zhang, 長, for smaller counties), who were the lowest local officials directly appointed by the central government. A special type of county, known as march (dao, 道), was used to administer certain areas with "barbarian" populations, especially on the frontiers of the empire.

In early Han dynasty, chief followers and relatives of the emperor were granted kingdoms. However, independence of the kings gradually diminished. After the failed Rebellion of the Seven States, drastic measures were instated to limit the power of the kings. From 145 BC onward, the central government controlled the appointment of all important officials in the kingdoms. Larger kingdoms were divided, and eventually the government of a kingdom became identical to that of a commandery. For example, the Chancellor (xiang, 相) was equivalent to a Grand Administrator. Similarly, marquessates were administered in the same way as counties.

By the end of the Western Han dynasty, the empire had 103 kingdoms and commanderies, as well as 1,587 counties. The Eastern Han census in 140 AD documented 99 kingdoms and commanderies, and 1,179 counties.

Provinces 
There were 13 provinces in the Han Empire. The capital region, although similar to a province in size, was not assigned an Inspector, but was instead inspected by the Colonel Director of Retainers (Sili xiaowei, 司隸校尉). The region was therefore often known as "Sili". 

During the Western Han dynasty, the Inspectors were agents of the central government, and did not permanently reside in the provinces. The Inspectors/Governors were transferred to the local government only in 35 AD.

Apart from the capital region, the 13 provinces are:

Commanderies

See also 
 Government of the Han dynasty
 History of the administrative divisions of China before 1912

References

Citations

Sources